The Andean gerbil mouse or Altiplano laucha (Eligmodontia puerulus) is a species of rodent in the family Cricetidae.
It is found in Argentina, Bolivia, Chile, and Peru.

References

 Baillie, J. 1996.  Eligmodontia puerulus.   2006 IUCN Red List of Threatened Species.   Downloaded on 19 July 2007.
Musser, G. G. and M. D. Carleton. 2005. Superfamily Muroidea. pp. 894–1531 in Mammal Species of the World a Taxonomic and Geographic Reference. D. E. Wilson and D. M. Reeder eds. Johns Hopkins University Press, Baltimore.

Eligmodontia
Mammals of the Andes
Mammals of Argentina
Mammals of Bolivia
Mammals of Chile
Mammals of Peru
Mammals described in 1896
Taxonomy articles created by Polbot